"The Question Is What Is the Question?" is a song by German musical group Scooter. It was released as the first single from their 13th studio album, Jumping All Over the World. The B-side, "The Fish is Jumping", is a jumpstyle remix of "How Much Is the Fish?".

Samples used
 "The Question Is What Is the Question?" interpolates the song "How Do You Do" by Mouth & MacNeal, taken from the 1972 album of the same name, and samples "I Like to Move It" by Reel 2 Real, the Think break, and Flamman & Abraxas' remix of "I Wanna Be a Hippy" by Technohead.
 "The Fish Is Jumping" interpolates the song "Zeven Dagen Lang" by the Dutch band Bots. This same piece of music is used on the 1998 Scooter single "How Much Is The Fish?", taken from the album No Time to Chill.

Track listings
German CD maxi and download
 "The Question Is What Is the Question?" (radio edit) (3:46)
 "The Question Is What Is the Question?" ('A Little Higher' Clubmix) (6:02)
 "The Question Is What Is the Question?" (extended) (5:50)
 "The Fish Is Jumping" (3:50)

12-inch
 "The Question Is What Is the Question?" ('A Little Higher' Clubmix) (6:02)
 "The Question Is What Is the Question?" (extended) (5:50)
 "The Fish Is Jumping" (3:50)

UK CD maxi and download
 "The Question Is What Is the Question?" (radio edit) (3:46)
 "The Question Is What Is the Question?" (extended) (5:50)
 "The Question Is What Is the Question?" (Headhunters Remix) (5:54)
 "The Question Is What Is the Question?" (Alex K Remix) (6:28)
 "The Question Is What Is the Question?" (Flip & Fill Remix) (5:50)
 "The Question Is What Is the Question?" (Micky Modelle Remix) (6:49)

Charts

Weekly charts

Year-end charts

References

Scooter (band) songs
2007 singles
2007 songs
2008 singles
All Around the World Productions singles
Jumpstyle songs
Songs written by H.P. Baxxter
Songs written by Hans van Hemert
Songs written by Jens Thele
Songs written by Michael Simon (DJ)
Songs written by Rick J. Jordan